Mariatu Kargbo (born 1985) is a Sierra Leonean model and beauty pageant titleholder who was crowned as the winner of the 2009 edition of the Miss Sierra Leone pageant.

Early life and education
Born in Bombali District Sierra Leone, Kargbo attended  secondary school in Freetown.

Pageantry

Miss Sierra Leone 2009
Whilst representing Bombali District, Kargbo was crowned winner of the 2009 edition of Miss Sierra Leone that was held on 13 June 2019 at the Family Kingdom Entertainment Complex in Freetown. This result qualified her to represent her country at the Miss World 2009 pageant held on 12 December at the Gallagher Convention Centre in Johannesburg, South Africa.

Miss World 2009
She represented Sierra Leone at the Miss World 2009 pageant  and placed in the Top Sixteen. This is the highest that any Sierra Leonean has finished at a Miss World contest.

External links
Mariatu Kargbo on Miss Sierra Leone 2009
 Miss World Official Profile

References

1985 births
Living people
Miss World 2009 delegates
Sierra Leonean beauty pageant winners
People from Makeni